Kolavdrija (also known as Kolavdra vas) is a former settlement in the Municipality of Moravče in central Slovenia. It is now part of the villages of Spodnji Tuštanj and Češnjice pri Moravčah. The area is part of the traditional region of Upper Carniola. The municipality is now included in the Central Slovenia Statistical Region.

Geography
Kolavdrija lies on the border between Spodnji Tuštanj and Češnjice pri Moravčah; the buildings on the west side of the settlement belong to the former, and those on the east side to the latter. Kolavdrija corresponds to the hamlet of Gabrovc.

History
Kolavdrija was annexed by Češnjice pri Moravčah in 1952, ending its existence as an independent settlement.

References

External links

Kolavdrija (labeled Gabrovc) on Geopedia

Populated places in the Municipality of Moravče
Former settlements in Slovenia